Chile competed at the 2019 Parapan American Games held from August 23 to September 1, 2019, in Lima, Peru. In total athletes representing Chile won 10 gold medals, 12 silver medals and 11 bronze medals and the country finished in 8th place in the medal table.

Competitors
The following is the list of number of competitors (per gender) participating at the games per sport/discipline.

Medalists

|align="left" valign="top"|

|align="left" valign="top"|

|align="left" valign="top"|

Athletics

Eleven athletes represented the Chile at the 2019 Parapan American Games.
Men's track

Men's field

Women's track

Women's field

Badminton

Men

Women

Boccia

Chile secured five quotas in boccia.

Cycling

Road
Men

Women

Track
Men

Women

Swimming

Men

Women

Powerlifting

Men

Women

Table tennis

Men

Women

Wheelchair basketball

Wheelchair rugby

Team roster
The mixed team was composed of 11 male athletes and one female athlete.
 Victor Bocaz
 Jeny Barraza
 Jonathan Flores
 Jonatan Alarcón
 Christian Madariaga
 Alexis Barraza
 Piero Arévalo
 Cristopher Flores
 Juan Rodríguez
 Diego Romero (captain)
 Ricardo Díaz
 Francisco Cayulef 
 Pablo Benavides (coach)
 Sebastián Caballero (assistant coach)

Results

Wheelchair tennis

References

2019 in Chilean sport
Chile at the Pan American Games
Nations at the 2019 Parapan American Games